Christos Terzanidis (born 13 February 1945) is a retired Greek footballer who played as a midfielder.

Career
Born in Melissokomeio in Kavala, Terzanidis played for PAOK F.C. and Panathinaikos F.C. He was a significant member of the PAOK wonder-team during the seventies. He won three major titles with PAOK scoring a total of 20 goals, then moved to Panathinaikos before he finally closed his career in Makedonikos F.C.

He earned 27 caps and scored 1 goal for the Greece national football team, and participated in UEFA Euro 1980.

Honours
PAOK
Greek Cup: 1972, 1974
Greek Championship: 1976

Panathinaikos
Balkans Cup: 1977

References

External links

1945 births
Living people
Footballers from Kavala
Greek Macedonians
Greek footballers
Greece international footballers
PAOK FC players
Panathinaikos F.C. players
Makedonikos F.C. players
PAOK FC managers
UEFA Euro 1980 players
Super League Greece players
Association football midfielders
Greek football managers